HMS Dart was an 8-gun lugger, reportedly previously the British privateer Dart, built in 1796, captured by the French in 1798, recaptured from the French in 1803, and sold in 1808.

Career
French records refer to her as the lugger Dart (or Dard), and state that she was a former British privateer named Dart, captured when she grounded at Calais in 1798.

The French refloated her and placed Dart in service in January 1799.

In 1802, after the Treaty of Amiens, she was under the command of enseigne de vaisseau Fayolle when she transported troops from Dunkirk to re-occupy the island of Gorée.

On 29 June 1803,  captured in the Bay of Biscay the French navy brig Dart, which was sailing from Martinique to Lorient. She was armed with four guns and had a 45-man crew. She and several other vessels had been carrying cargo to Martinique. She was under the command of lieutenant de vaisseau Fayolle. Apollo sent Dart into Portsmouth.

The Royal Navy took her into service as HMS Dart.

There is no record of her being commissioned or in service, which suggests that she may never actually have served before she was sold.

Fate
The "Principal Officers and Commissioners of His Majesty's Navy" on 18 March 1808 offered for sale "The Hull of His Majesty's Lugger Dart, lying in Hamoaze". She sold that month.

Notes

Citations

References
  
 

1796 ships
Captured ships
Ships of the French Navy
Luggers of the Royal Navy